Cogez is a surname. Notable people with the surname include:

Caroline Sascha Cogez, Danish and French director and writer
Anna Cogez